Reza Roosta Azad (23 February 1962 – 11 October 2022) was an Iranian academic who was the chancellor of Sharif University of Technology, serving from 2010 until 2014.

Roosta Azad held a BSc from Isfahan University of Technology, a MSc from Istanbul Technical University and a PhD from the University of Waterloo.

Azad ranked 27th in the university entrance examination in 1980 and graduated ranking first in all three levels of undergraduate, master and PhD. His scientific activities include, 39 research projects, 43 articles published in prestigious national and international journals, 68 papers in national and international conferences, and supervising more than 80 master's and doctoral theses.

References

External links 
Official website - Sharif University of Technology

1962 births
2022 deaths
Istanbul Technical University alumni
University of Waterloo alumni
University of Isfahan alumni
Academic staff of Sharif University of Technology
Chancellors of the Sharif University of Technology
Society of Devotees of the Islamic Revolution politicians
Popular Front of Islamic Revolution Forces politicians
People from Tehran